Parkhi, or Parkhie is a surname of Deshastha Rigvedi Brahmins. The common Gotra found in Parkhis is Vashishtha. They are mostly located in Pune and Nagpur.
Other Parkhis are also found in Ahmednagar, Mumbai, Thane, Nashik, Dombivali and abroad in the United States and United Kingdom.

Raghunath Shatanand Parkhi (1901–1968) was one of the stalwarts in the field of Library Science in India. He was the Librarian of Fergusson College, Pune and a visiting professor at DRTC Bangalore. R.S. Parkhi originated from Bhor, one of the princely states of British India, under the Poona political agency. His ancestors worked with Pantsachiv Shankarrao Chimnajirao, the Ruler of Bhor. Like many Maharashtrian surnames originate from their native place or from their profession, it is believed that "Parkhi" surname originated from being a "Connoisseur" at Bhor Sansthan.

Gopal Gangadhar Parkhi, known as Go Gam Parkhi (1926–1982) was a writer. The famous Marathi movie Sangatye Aika was based on his novel, similarly the movies Pahu Re Kiti Wat and Jidd were also based on his stories. He wrote many dramas including Kachech Ghar, Akshansh Rekhansh, Katha Kunachi Vyatha Kuna, Navi kahani Smruti Purani, Mihi Ahe Ek Jatayu, and Halo Mi Boltoy. 'His father Gangadhar Gopal Parkhi (1900-1933) was a writer, who wrote the book Nibandh Manjiri. This book was a school textbook and was published by Chitrashala Press, Pune in 1931.

Ramesh Parkhi also known as R. M. Parkhi was the former head of Quality of Tata Motors. He was responsible for commercial vehicles mostly but also the first 500 cars of the long-produced and still in production today Tata Indica. In 2013 he had published the book Market Leadership by Quality and Reliability. The book is meant to be a guide on product development from his experience in the Automotive Industry.

Shishir Parkhie is a ghazal singer based in Nagpur who has performed internationally with many albums to his name.

Indian surnames